Peter Lenes (born April 3, 1986) is a former American ice hockey player. He last played for the EC Kitzbuhel of the Alps Hockey League.

Prior to turning professional, Lenes attended the University of Vermont where he played four seasons of NCAA Division I college hockey with the Vermont Catamounts men's ice hockey team where he scored 46 goals and 46 assists for 92 points in 148 games.

On January 11, 2012, the Trenton Titans of the ECHL traded Lenes, along with defenseman Jordon Southorn, to the Wheeling Nailers in exchange for future considerations.

On July 31, 2013, Lenes returned for to attempt a second stint in Austria, signing a try-out deal as a free agent with Dornbirner EC.

Lenes has since retired from playing professional hockey and started a hockey training and development company with former NHLer and University of Vermont teammate Torrey Mitchell.

Career statistics

References

External links

Living people
1986 births
Graz 99ers players
Hamilton Bulldogs (AHL) players
Ice hockey people from Vermont
Ontario Reign (ECHL) players
People from Shelburne, Vermont
Sioux City Musketeers players
Trenton Titans players
Vermont Catamounts men's ice hockey players
Wheeling Nailers players
American men's ice hockey right wingers